Acalolepta bolanica is a species of beetle in the family Cerambycidae. It was described by Per Olof Christopher Aurivillius in 1926. It is known from Papua New Guinea.

References

Acalolepta
Beetles described in 1926